"Starry Eyed Surprise" is a song by English record producer Oakenfold featuring vocals from Shifty Shellshock of Crazy Town. The song was released on 19 August 2002 as the second single from Oakenfold's debut album, Bunkka (2002), reaching number six in the United Kingdom, number 19 in the Netherlands and New Zealand, number 21 in Ireland, and number 37 in Australia. It also reached the top 50 in Italy and the United States. It was later included on Shifty Shellshock's 2004 album Happy Love Sick and Oakenfold's 2007 album Greatest Hits & Remixes, Vol. 1.

Content
The line "Freaky deaky, star speckles and pink butterflies", sung by Shifty Shellshock, is sung in a similar manner to that of his band's previous single, "Butterfly". The song also samples "Everybody's Talkin'" by Harry Nilsson, which is a cover version of the original by Fred Neil, hence why Neil received a songwriter credit for "Starry Eyed Surprise".

Track listings

UK CD single
 "Starry Eyed Surprise" (single edit) – 3:09
 "Starry Eyed Surprise" (Josh Wink re-interpretation) – 8:43
 "Starry Eyed Surprise" (Oliver Lieb remix) – 7:52
 "Starry Eyed Surprise" (video)

UK 12-inch single
A. "Starry Eyed Surprise" (Josh Wink re-interpretation)
B. "Starry Eyed Surprise" (Oliver Lieb remix)

UK cassette single
 "Starry Eyed Surprise" (single edit)
 "Starry Eyed Surprise" (Josh Wink re-interpretation)

European CD single
 "Starry Eyed Surprise" (single edit)
 "Starry Eyed Surprise" (Oliver Lieb remix)

Australian and New Zealand CD single
 "Starry Eyed Surprise" (single edit) – 3:09
 "Mortal" – 6:44
 "Starry Eyed Surprise" (Josh Wink re-interpretation) – 8:43
 "Starry Eyed Surprise" (Oliver Lieb remix) – 7:52
 "Starry Eyed Surprise" (video)

Credits and personnel
Credits are lifted from the UK CD single liner notes.

Studios
 Recorded at Real Noize (UK) and Real World (Box, Wiltshire, England)

Personnel

 Paul Oakenfold – writing, production, mixing, vocal recording
 Shifty Shellshock – writing (as Seth Binzer), vocals
 Andy Gray – writing, programming, production, mixing, engineering
 Fred Neil – writing
 Emerson Swinford – guitars
 Mark Ralph – guitars
 Jeff Turzo – additional production
 Carmen Rizzo – vocal recording
 Steve Osborne – vocal mixing
 Ed Chadwick – engineering assistant
 Michael Nash Associates – artwork design
 Matthew Donaldson – cover photography
 Anton Corbijn – Paul Oakenfold photo (back cover)

Charts

Weekly charts

Year-end charts

References

External links
 Music Video

Paul Oakenfold songs
2002 singles
2002 songs
Maverick Records singles
Perfecto Records singles
Songs written by Paul Oakenfold
UK Independent Singles Chart number-one singles